Komarada is a village in Parvathipuram Manyam district of the Indian state of Andhra Pradesh.

Demography

 Census of India, Komarada had a population of 5,551. The total population constitute, 2,462 males and 3,089 females —a sex ratio of 1255 females per 1000 males. 427 children are in the age group of 0–6 years, of which 204 are boys and 223 are girls —a ratio of 1093 per 1000. The average literacy rate stands at 69.03% with 3,537 literates, significantly higher than the state average of 67.41%.

Government and politics
Komarada gram panchayat is the local self-government of the village. The elected members of the gram panchayat is headed by a sarpanch. The sarpanch of the villages was awarded Nirmala Grama Puraskaram for the year 2013.

References 

Villages in Parvathipuram Manyam district